Cyperus houghtonii, commonly known as Houghton's flatsedge, is a species of sedge that is native to parts of North America.

See also
List of Cyperus species

References

houghtonii
Plants described in 1836
Flora of Colorado
Flora of Idaho
Flora of Illinois
Flora of Indiana
Flora of Maine
Flora of Manitoba
Flora of Maryland
Flora of Michigan
Flora of Minnesota
Flora of New Hampshire
Flora of New York (state)
Flora of Ohio
Flora of Ontario
Flora of Oregon
Flora of Quebec
Flora of Vermont
Flora of Virginia
Flora of Washington (state)
Flora of West Virginia
Flora of Wisconsin
Flora of Massachusetts
Flora of Pennsylvania
Taxa named by John Torrey
Flora without expected TNC conservation status